Matteo Gazzini (born 9 July 1985) is an Italian politician who has been serving as a Member of the European Parliament for Lega Nord since 2022.

References

See also 

 List of members of the European Parliament for Italy, 2019–2024

Living people
1985 births
People from Bolzano
21st-century Italian politicians
Lega Nord MEPs

MEPs for Italy 2019–2024